The Ferrari F14 T (also known by its internal name, Project Code 665) is a Formula One racing car used by Ferrari to compete in the 2014 Formula One season. It was driven by former World Drivers' Champions Fernando Alonso and Kimi Räikkönen, who came from a two-year stint at Lotus Renault to rejoin the team after a five-year absence. The F14 T was designed to use Ferrari's new 1.6-litre V6 turbocharged engine, the 059/3, replacing the 2.4 litre V8 from the F138. The name of the car was chosen by fans in a poll organised by Ferrari. The "14" represents the year of competition, and the "T" reflects the series' shift to a turbocharged engine formula.

The chassis was designed by James Allison, Pat Fry, Nikolas Tombazis and Loïc Bigois with Rory Byrne serving a design consultant and Luca Marmorini leading the powertrain design.

Even with the lineup of Alonso and Räikkönen, the car was not successful, scoring only two podium finishes (both by Alonso) in the entire season. Many technical changes were made, with the KERS and ERS systems working with the 1.6 litre V6 turbocharged engine, an 8-speed gearbox and a more powerful DRS system.

Design
The F14 T was unveiled on 25 January 2014. Like all 2014 Formula One cars, the F14 T featured a lower nose, with a flatter concept compared to other 2014 cars. Ferrari retained their pullrod front suspension, despite reports that it would be dropped. The rear was revised to accommodate the new powerplant and rear wing rules.

Complete Formula One results
(key) (results in italics indicate fastest lap)

References

F14 T
2014 Formula One season cars